Mario Minieri (born 21 June 1938) is a retired Italian professional road bicycle racer, who rode the Tour de France in 1961, 62, 64, 65 and 67 and Giro d'Italia in 1968. He won a stage in the 1960 Tour of Sicily and stage 8A from the 1962 Tour de France.

References

External links 

Official Tour de France results for Mario Minieri

Italian male cyclists
1938 births
Living people
Italian Tour de France stage winners
Sportspeople from the Metropolitan City of Bologna
Cyclists from Emilia-Romagna